Verkh-Rechki is a rural locality (a village) in Sylvenskoye Rural Settlement, Permsky District, Perm Krai, Russia. The population was 7 as of 2010. There are 8 streets.

Geography 
Verkh-Rechki is located 34 km northeast of Perm (the district's administrative centre) by road. Lyady is the nearest rural locality.

References 

Rural localities in Permsky District